Time and the Hour is a 1957 novel by the British writer Howard Spring. It is set in the Bradford area. The title is taken from a line of Shakespeare's Macbeth.

References

Bibliography
 George Watson & Ian R. Willison. The New Cambridge Bibliography of English Literature, Volume 4. CUP, 1972.

1957 British novels
Novels by Howard Spring
William Collins, Sons books
Novels set in Yorkshire